The Guardian was a weekly Anglican newspaper published from January 1846 to November 1951. It was founded by Richard William Church, Thomas Henry Haddan, and other supporters of the Tractarian movement and was for many years the leading newspaper of the Church of England. Montague Bernard, another of the paper's founders, served as its initial editor, with Martin Sharp taking over responsibility for the paper in 1859. He stood down as editor in 1883 and was replaced by Daniel Conner Lathbury. His outspoken views on political and ecclesiastical matters, and especially his opposition to the Boer War, led to his dismissal in 1899. Later editors included Walter Hobhouse (1900-05), James Penderel-Brodhurst (1905-22) and Frederic Iremonger (1922-27).

C. S. Lewis published his Screwtape Letters in serial form in The Guardian as well as The Great Divorce, the former in the early 1940s and the latter in 1944 and 1945. He also used The Guardian for some of his essays, including "Miracles" (October 1942), "Dogma and the Universe" and "Dogma and Science", both in March 1943. The paper closed in November 1951 due to increased costs of production.

References
Notes by the Way.djvu/82
Notes by the Way.djvu/83

1846 establishments in the United Kingdom
Defunct newspapers published in the United Kingdom
Defunct weekly newspapers
Publications disestablished in 1951
Publications established in 1846